'''Ankit Soni is an Indian cricketer who played for the Gujarat Lions, a team that represented the Indian state of Gujarat in the Indian Premier League. He was signed up by the franchise in April 2017 as a replacement for the injured Shivil Kaushik. He made his Twenty20 debut for Gujarat Lions in the 2017 Indian Premier League on 27 April 2017.

References

External links
 

1993 births
Living people
Indian cricketers
Gujarat Lions cricketers
Cricketers from Mumbai